Bert Gentry Lee (born 1942) is an American scientist, space engineer, and science fiction author.  He is currently chief engineer for the Planetary Flight Systems Directorate at the Jet Propulsion Laboratory.

Space career
Lee had engineering oversight responsibility for the twin rover missions to Mars that landed in January 2004, the Mars Reconnaissance Orbiter (MRO) in 2006, and the Deep Impact and Stardust missions. He was also the chief engineer for the Galileo project from 1977–1988 and director of science analysis and mission planning during the Viking projects.

In 2009, Gentry narrated and appeared in Discovery Channel's 2-hour special "Are We Alone?", which examined the possibility of life on other worlds in the solar system.

Writing career
As an author he is best known for co-writing, with Arthur C. Clarke, the books Cradle in 1989, Rama II in 1989, The Garden of Rama in 1991 and Rama Revealed in 1993. He collaborated with Carl Sagan on the 1980 series Cosmos.

Rendezvous With Rama was written in 1972 and Clarke had no intention of writing a sequel. Lee turned the Rama series into a more character-driven story following the adventures of Nicole des Jardins Wakefield, who becomes the main character in Rama II, The Garden of Rama, and Rama Revealed. When asked, Arthur C. Clarke said that Gentry Lee did the writing while he was a source of ideas.

Lee went on to write three more science fiction novels after Rama Revealed. Two take place in the Rama universe (Bright Messengers, Double Full Moon Night) while one makes several references to it (Tranquility Wars).

Awards 

In 2006, he was awarded the Masursky Award for Meritorious Service to Planetary Science by the Division for Planetary Sciences of the American Astronomical Society, for his lifetime of contributions to systems engineering of robotic planetary missions.

In 2021, he was elected a member of the National Academy of Engineering for contributions to 20 planetary exploration missions to Mars, Jupiter, asteroids, and comets.

Bibliography

Cradle (1989) (with Arthur C. Clarke)
Rama II (1989) (with Arthur C. Clarke)
The Garden of Rama (1991) (with Arthur C. Clarke)
Rama Revealed (1993) (with Arthur C. Clarke)
Bright Messengers (1996)
Double Full Moon Night (2000)
Tranquility Wars (2001)
A History of the Twenty-First Century (2003) (with Michael White)

Television

Cosmos: A Personal Voyage (1980) (co-writer)
Are We Alone? (2009) (narrator)
Living Universe: Journey to Another Stars'' (2018)

References

External links

 
 
 
  (segment on Gentry Lee from 1:08:19 to 1:11:09 in video)
 

Living people
20th-century American novelists
21st-century American novelists
21st-century American engineers
American male novelists
American science fiction writers
1942 births
Jet Propulsion Laboratory
20th-century American male writers
21st-century American male writers
Fellows of Jet Propulsion Laboratory